is a Japanese anime television series created by Gainax, with animation produced by Gainax and Madhouse, and directed by Hiroyuki Yamaga. It was broadcast for thirteen episodes on Kids Station from April to June 2002. The series was licensed for English release in North America by ADV Films.

A manga adaptation, authored by Satoru Akahori and illustrated by Ryūsei Deguchi, was serialized in Kodansha's seinen manga magazine Monthly Magazine Z from September 2001 to August 2002, with its chapters collected in two tankōbon volumes. It was licensed for English release in North America by Tokyopop. Another manga by Kenji Tsuruta, titled Manga Abenobashi Mahō ☆ Shōtengai, was serialized in Kodansha's Monthly Afternoon from September 2001 to May 2002.

Story

Background
During the Heian Era (794–1185), Abe no Seimei was a close childhood friend of a noble named Masayuki, and his wife, Mune. While he was away from the palace, Masayuki often asked Seimei to stay by his wife's side, guarding her and keeping her company. However, during the time that they spent together, Mune and Seimei fell in love and became increasingly romantically involved. Unbeknownst to them, Masayuki soon learned of the affair, and became overcome with grief and jealousy. One day while Seimei was on a trip to Kyoto, Masayuki snapped, murdered Mune and committed suicide. Guided by a premonition, Seimei rushed back to his hometown only to find out that he was too late. Overcome with guilt, he decided to perform a forbidden onmyō, ritual to resurrect the dead, by transferring himself and the bodies of Masayuki and Mune into a completely different world in which they were still alive. In doing so, Seimei soon found himself as "Mr. Abe" in mid-20th-century Osaka, where Mune Imamiya and Masayuki Asahina were pre-existing residents of this alternate world. Now, Masayuki was an ambitious, but largely unsuccessful young man who had enlisted Mr. Abe's assistance to build the Abenobashi Shopping Arcade. He was also madly in love with Mune, a local girl whom he tried to woo (with little success) at every possible occasion. It was not long, however, before Mune fell in love with Abe, constantly pursuing him and offering him a home-made lunch. Abe tried for a time to resist her advances, but eventually he was unable to contain his feelings, and made love with Mune in his apartment. Unbeknownst to them, an instantly-jealous Masayuki accidentally discovered the truth. The next night he became staggeringly drunk and invited Abe to meet him at the Abeno Shrine, planning to murder him with a hidden butcher knife when he arrived. At first unsuspecting, Abe arrived on the scene, but once he saw the decrepitly drunk Masa he knew what was afoot. He promptly bid Masayuki farewell, then disappeared, going back to his job in the Heian Era, leaving a pregnant Mune behind him; her child is Sasshi's father.

Plot
Childhood friends Arumi and Sasshi are residents of the Abenobashi commercial district in Abeno-ku, Osaka. After an accident, they find themselves transported to an alternate sword and sorcery world. Their attempt to get back to reality finds them traversing a series of nonsensical worlds built on science fiction, war, fantasy, dating sim games and American movies. Each alternate Abenobashi is a surreal manifestation of Sasshi's otaku interests, populated by analogs of the protagonist's relatives and acquaintances and a blue-haired stranger known as Eutus.

Their quest to return home is at its core a bildungsroman because the Abenobashi dimensions are mostly hobby worlds of increasing sophistication. Sasshi does not want to go home, and in fact is the sole force that is propelling them between worlds. While chasing a cat in the first episode, Arumi's grandfather fell off a roof and was hospitalized. With this new trauma pressuring him in addition to his apprehension about the eventual destruction of the shopping arcade and the Asahina's moving away, Sasshi was no longer willing or able to cope with reality, and unbeknownst to even himself, he had caused their dimension to rewrite itself into worlds echoing his escapist obsessions.

Characters

Main characters

Sayaka‘s younger brother, he is a precocious, hyperactive, 12-year-old typical Osakan boy. He has a huge passion for collecting, role-playing games, sci-fi, dinosaurs, guns and visual novels. Sasshi's family used to run the local bathhouse, the Turtle Bath, but was forced to give it up and move out due to redevelopment plans for the Abenobashi Shopping Arcade area. Sasshi spends his lazy days hanging out with his best friend Arumi. While visiting each world, Sasshi is quick to learn the gimmick behind each one, and eventually begins playing by the world's "rules". It is strongly hinted he has feelings for Arumi, and is preventing them from going back due to the fact she will leave for Hokkaido.

Sasshi's best friend and classmate, she is also 12 years old, having practically grown up together with him in the Abenobashi Shopping Arcade. A sensible and pragmatic girl who is a foil to Sasshi. Arumi's eccentric father and stubborn grandfather run a French restaurant in the Shopping Arcade known as the Grill Pelican. It appears, however, that the Asahina family will be closing up shop in the near future as part of redevelopment in the area and moving to Hokkaido, forcing Arumi to leave Sasshi behind. She expresses a strong distaste for every world that she and Sasshi visit.

Other characters

A recurring element of the Abenobashi dimensions who shares a bond with Sasshi, claiming to be doomed to wander dimensions until the cause of this misfortune is rectified. His real identity is the legendary onmyoji Abe no Seimei, ultimately the one who created the Abenobashi Shopping Arcade in the guise of Mr. Abe. This in turn enables the existence of Sasshi and Arumi, with Abe being the former's (illegitimate) paternal grandfather.

Arumi's stubborn and willful grandfather and the founder of the Grill Pelican restaurant, Masayuki has been around since the creation of the shopping arcade and befriended its head of construction Abe. It reality, Masayuki was originally a friend of Abe in the past, committing the murder of his wife Mune out of jealously towards Abe and taking his own life. Though Abe managed to revive the two in the modern era, history nearly repeated itself and Abe is forced to leave the two to look after Abenobashi. However, Masayuki succumbs to injuries he receives in a fall from the roof of the Grille Pelican and dies. Sasshi's refusal to accept that reality is one of the reasons why he and Arumi are unable to return to their dimension, with Masayuki often depicted as a figure of high authority or importance in each parallel world.

A voluptuous bespectacled redhead in the assorted Abenobashi dimensions in various roles from antagonist to comedic relief, which are always undertaken with great flair that stand her against even the surreal background of the hobby worlds. Mune-Mune is nearly always searching for Eutus, the reason tied to the fact that she is a parallel version of Sasshi's paternal grandmother Mune Imamiya in her youth, Originally, in Abe's time she was Masayuki's wife and her falling in love with Abe led to her death by her husband's hand. In his attempt to resolve this, Abe managed to revive Mune in the modern age. However, history nearly repeated itself and Abe left with Mune's heart broken. She married and started a family while running the Turtle Bath before she died of natural cases. The name Mune, literally translates to "chest" is a pun upon her parallel self's prominent breasts.

A cross-dresser with an overly-affectionate auntie-type attitude. Being a lifelong resident of the Abenobashi Shopping Arcade, he is quite knowledgeable about the history of the area and its people. In each parallel world, he is often depicted in various comedic female roles.

Sasshi's older sister. A stereotypical teenage girl, she is quite intent on being cool by shying away from the family's Osaka influences. She diets and has an interest in fortune telling. Sayaka shows up within the Abenobashi dimensions accompanying Mune-mune and Ms. Aki.

A shady businessman who runs a stall selling food as well as many different trinkets that may or may not be as helpful as he claims. Kouhei always seems to have a friendly aside for Sasshi and Arumi - especially when he perceives the opportunity to wring them for money. He is depicted in each parallel world as some sort of vendor.
Arata Imamiya

Sasshi and Sayaka's father.
Mitsuyo Imamiya

Sasshi and Sayaka's mother.
Tarou Imamiya

Sasshi and Sayaka's grandfather.

Media

Manga
A manga adaptation by Satoru Akahori and illustrated by Ryūsei Deguchi, was serialized in Kodansha's Monthly Magazine Z from the September 2001 issue to the August 2002 issue, with its chapters collected in two tankōbon volumes released on March 19 and July 19, 2002. The manga was licensed for English release in North America by Tokyopop, who published both volumes on August 10 and November 9, 2004, respectively. The manga went out of print in 2009.

Another manga adaptation by Kenji Tsuruta, titled , was serialized in Kodansha's Monthly Afternoon from the September 2001 issue to the May 2002 issue, with a tankōbon volume released on April 20, 2002.

Anime
Magical Shopping Arcade Abenobashi was produced by Gainax and Madhouse. The series is directed by Hiroyuki Yamaga and Masayuki Kojima, with series composition by Yamaga and Satoru Akahori and screenplay by Jukki Hanada. The original character designs were done by Kenji Tsuruta. The music was composed by Shirō Sagisu. The series run for 13 episodes on Kids Station from April 4 to June 27, 2002.

In North America, ADV Films announced the series' acquisition at Anime Boston in April 2003. The series was launched in four DVDs from December 16, 2003 to April 20, 2004. The series aired on G4's anime block Anime Unleashed in 2005. It also aired online on Anime Network in 2009. AEsir Holdings re-released the series on a single DVD volume on December 11, 2012.

Episode list

Reception
Magical Shopping Arcade Abenobashi received an Excellence Award for animation at the 2002 Japan Media Arts Festival.

References

External links
Magical Shopping Arcade Abenobashi at Gainax 

2001 manga
2002 anime television series debuts
ADV Films
Anime composed by Shirō Sagisu
Anime and manga about parallel universes
Anime with original screenplays
Gainax
Isekai anime and manga
Kids Station original programming
Kodansha manga
Madhouse (company)
Parody anime and manga
Satoru Akahori
Seinen manga
Television shows set in Osaka
Tokyopop titles